Miracles is an American mystery-drama television series starring Skeet Ulrich and Angus Macfadyen that aired on ABC from January 27 to December 26, 2003. The series created by Richard Hatem and Michael Petroni, the series was dubbed a "spiritual version of The X-Files" by its creators. Following the pilot, David Greenwalt, co-creator of Angel (the spin-off of Buffy the Vampire Slayer) served as the show's executive producer and head writer for the remaining twelve episodes.

Miracles follows Paul Callan, an investigator of modern miracles for the Catholic Church who questions his faith after repeatedly finding mundane explanations for various supposed phenomena. After he witnesses a true, supernatural miracle that saves his life, only for his findings to be dismissed on a lack of evidence, Paul leaves the Church behind and is approached by Alva Keel to join his organization Sodalitas Quaerito, investigating and cataloging "unexplainable" phenomena. Along with former police officer Evelyn Santos, Paul and Alva attempt to battle the impending "darkness" before it's too late.

The series premiered as part of ABC's "Super Monday" line-up on January 27, 2003. Six episodes were broadcast on ABC before the series was canceled because of low ratings, with its final broadcast episode drawing five million viewers on March 31, 2003. The series was preempted a number of times during its run, once for a rebroadcast of the documentary special Living with Michael Jackson and various other times to air repeats or news magazine specials about the then-developing Iraq War. Miracles fans, angered by the cancellation and what they saw as ABC's mismanagement of the show's Monday 10:00pm time slot, began a fan campaign to revive the show. Fans wrote messages on napkins (referencing a plot point in the pilot episode) and mailed them to various networks hoping the show would be revived by another network; however, efforts were unsuccessful and the show did not continue past its initial order of thirteen episodes.

Plot
The series begins as Paul Callan (Skeet Ulrich), an investigator of modern miracles for the Catholic Church at the Archdiocese of Boston, is feeling frustrated with disappointing groups of believers each time he investigates and disproves the authenticity of a supposed "miracle". Upon the advice of his mentor, Father "Poppi" Calero (Héctor Elizondo), Paul takes a sabbatical. Months later while doing humanitarian work in Arizona, Paul receives a phone call from Poppi asking him to investigate the case of a young boy with supposed healing powers in the nearby town of Cottonwood. Paul finally sees a true miracle when he sees that young Tommy Ferguson (Jacob Smith) can truly heal people, but every time Tommy heals someone, his own rare disease worsens. When Paul is involved in a near fatal car accident, Tommy uses his healing power for the last time and dies healing Paul, but not before both of them see Paul's blood form itself into the words "God is Now Here" on his broken windshield.

His faith restored, Paul returns to the Church, only for the Monsignor to dismiss his report on a lack of proof. Paul resigns out of frustration and discovers that Poppi never called him about Tommy Ferguson's case. Later, Paul is approached at a diner by a man named Alva Keel (Angus Macfadyen), who offers him a job with his organization, Sodalitas Quaerito (Latin for "Brotherhood in search of truth"). Keel tells Paul that his encounter with "hemography" (blood forming itself into readable words) is part of a large, dark impending event; the same miracle has appeared to six other people in the past 25 years, only every other time the message appeared as "God is Nowhere". Paul teams up with Keel and Evelyn Santos (Marisa Ramirez), a former police officer, to investigate his paranormal experience and discover a solution to the impending darkness.

Cast

Main
 Skeet Ulrich as Paul Callan, a former investigator of modern miracles for the Catholic Church. Paul was an orphan from a very young age; his mother died when he was only five years old of an unknown ailment, and he never met his biological father. When he was seven years old, he spent two weeks at St. Jerome's Hospital being treated for pneumonia, which he nearly died from. Paul resigned from the church after the monsignor dismissed his report on the Tommy Ferguson case. He then teamed up with Alva Keel and Evelyn Santos and began working for "Sodalitas Quaerito".
 Angus Macfadyen as Alva Keel, a former Harvard professor. On November 16, 1985, while minoring in Linguistics at Cambridge University, he began his senior project, a study on bird calls and recorded several of them on tapes. While playing them back five days later, he began hearing his mother's voice repeating "Alva...Alva..." amongst the bird calls. In 1998 he founded Sodalitas Quaerito, a small business that investigates and catalogues various phenomena, to fund his research.
 Marisa Ramirez as Evelyn Santos, a former police officer and single mother. The father of her child, John, is in prison. Little is known about how she came to work with Keel, but it was revealed in a deleted scene that she was shot in the head in the line of duty, and had a paranormal experience where she believes she saw that there was nothing on "the other side".

Recurring
 Héctor Elizondo as Father "Poppi" Calero, Paul's mentor throughout his entire life, who is a father at the church where Paul grew up and used to work. Appeared in the pilot episode, and then reappeared in later episodes of the series.
 Jacob Smith as Thomas "Tommy" Ferguson, a ten-year-old boy from Cottonwood, Arizona with healing powers. His power was discovered after he hugged his grandmother, who had lung cancer, and told her he hoped she felt better; his grandmother then left the hospital two days later, when her cancer completely disappeared. Sacrificed his own life to save Paul Callan's after his car was hit by a train, leaving him in a state of near death. Tommy appeared in the pilot episode, and then appeared as a ghost in the episodes "Little Miss Lost" and "Paul is Dead".

History

Origins
Series creator Richard Hatem was sent a screenplay in early 2001 called "Miracles", written by Michael Petroni and owned by Spyglass Entertainment. Hatem assumed that he was being sent the script to re-write, and the script would then be made into a feature film. Hatem recalled in "The Making of Miracles" interview on the Miracles DVD set that he was puzzled when he was sent the script to re-write, because he thought it was "pretty wonderful as it [was]". Hatem's agent later confirmed to him that Spyglass actually wanted him to use the screenplay as a jumping off point to create a one-hour television series, "a sort of 'spiritual X-Files".

When Hatem met with executives at Spyglass, he brought with him a "good luck charm," the book The Physical Phenomena of Mysticism by Herbert Thurston, which Hatem said Miracles later "evolved into." Thurston was an Anglican minister who investigated spiritual phenomena during the 1920s and 1930s, when, according to Hatem, "spiritualism (the contacting of the dead through séances and mediums) was still popular in America." The book examined which phenomena were signs from God, and which were "something else." After discussing this with Megan Wolpert and Suzanne Patmore, executives at Spyglass, Hatem said "what [he] expected would be a 20-minute meeting turned into a three hour meeting, where ideas were flowing back and forth." Hatem claimed the show was born "that day, in that room" in March 2001. Hatem, Wolpert, and Patmore liked the idea that a character (Paul Callan) who came from a strict religious background and was raised to believe that any strange occurrence was either a sign from God or a sign from the devil, was suddenly thrust into a world where various phenomena "crossed those boundaries" and could not be classified as "good or bad" because they had elements of both. Hatem believes this is the element that "creates the drama," and makes the show "fun and scary."

Hatem, Wolpert, and Patmore researched various supernatural and religious folklore and found that most of those types of encounters could "find a nexis in [Miracles], and [they] could do all kinds of stories". The three also agreed that "[Miracles] could not be a show about the Catholic Church [...] ABC was not interested in taking that on". Hatem referenced in the Miracles DVD interview a short-lived series that aired on ABC during the 1997–98 season called Nothing Sacred, which centered on the Catholic Church in the 1970s. While the show's main character was raised with a Catholic upbringing, Hatem did not want to make the series about a "Vatican conspiracy". Hatem did however acknowledge that the pilot episode transitioned from religious phenomena to paranormal phenomena, and that the transition between "'religion' and 'general paranormal' [was a huge challenge] all the way through, because the questions kept coming back: 'Is this guy a priest?'; 'How do we explain he's not a priest?'; 'How do we explain that his points of view are not the points of view of the Catholic Church?'". Hatem also acknowledged that as they were preparing to "sell a show whose pilot has priests, and a monsignor", the Church was in the midst of a sex abuse scandal that was being reported in newspapers all over the country. Hatem recalled that "the joke was, '[the show wasn't] on the air long enough to generate controversy'; we would have loved controversy, but we flew so low under the radar that I don't think anyone had a chance to be offended or even construe a way to take offense".

Casting
The production team had many ideas for casting, and Richard Hatem says that Skeet Ulrich was one of the first ideas for an actor to play Paul Callan. However, the producers believed that Ulrich was "unavailable", and that he was taking a break from acting and living with his wife and kids in Virginia. Among the other actors who auditioned for Paul Callan were Matthew Fox, known for his starring role on the series Party of Five and who went on to star in Lost, and Jason Priestley, which Hatem says "would have been an excellent casting pun". During auditions, a Miracles producer learned that Ulrich had been sent the script by his agents and managers, and that he had "really responded to it". Matt Reeves, the director of the pilot, was impressed that he was able to exude soulfulness, emotion, and intelligence without speaking.

Hatem said that when casting the part of Alva Keel, a mysterious person was necessary for the role, "someone who would draw Paul away from the Church and bring him into this strange world of paranormal investigation". Donald Sutherland was an original casting idea, because the producers originally wanted someone who was around the same age as Hector Elizondo, to persuade Paul to leave behind one father figure and follow another. However, after many people auditioned, the producers took note of Angus Macfadyen's ability to without speaking, like Ulrich, portray intensity and mystery. The casting of Macfadyen gave the producers the idea of instead of following a new father figure, Paul Callan would join a group based on "brotherhood", "someone who was more of an age contemporary with Paul".

Hatem recalls casting the part of Evelyn Santos as "difficult, because technically, she doesn't exist in the pilot; she has one shot in the first episode, and in the original pilot, she was played by a different actress". Because Evelyn has no real lines in the pilot episode, extensive casting was not held. After the pilot was picked up, the producers faced the challenge of casting a character "for whom [they] had never written anything". Producers cast Marisa Ramirez very late in the audition process, after the episode "The Ghost" had already been filmed. Ramirez was cast because the producers wanted someone "watchable" and at the same time "normal, and real" as a contrast to Paul and Keel, who had each lived unusual lives. Hatem described the three leads as a "weird, paranormal Brady Bunch" because of each of the characters' non-nuclear families.

Development
Richard Hatem says that the backdrop of the stories of Miracles were intentionally made to be those of everyday life, to better connect with the audience. Hatem acknowledged Stephen King as a powerful influence in the development of Miracles, as well as his own career; in the DVD interview he commented that "if you tell people you want to do something like Stephen King, people will listen to you". He references a book in his personal collection about a haunted apartment complex in Santa Ana, California, which Hatem claims to "love more than anything"; "I would love to visit the haunted apartment complex in Santa Ana". Hatem recalls enjoying the "haunted gas station mini mart" from the episode The Battle at Shadow Ridge, which he claimed to possibly be the "goofiest" episode of the series; Hatem said, "If a gas station mini mart can be haunted, then I can go to sleep a happy man; then I know this world is truly a special place".

Richard Hatem joked that he and David Greenwalt adopted mundane as the "buzzword" of the series, although they never told anyone because "that's not what a network likes to hear". Hatem and Greenwalt used the idea of "mundane" throughout the series as a way of showing the audience that strange occurrences can happen in everyday places. Hatem recalled that despite hoping and expecting that the series would be on the air for as many as ten seasons, he and Greenwalt had not fully mapped out a "ten-season-long mythology" of the show where the question "Darkness or light?" would ultimately be answered. Hatem references the "two kinds of episodes of The X-Files: 'stand-alones', and 'mythology episodes'", and holding a preference for stand-alone episodes because when the mythology starts to be unraveled, "that's when it becomes no fun anymore".

Themes
Richard Hatem addressed in DVD commentary and interviews some of the show's more frequent themes.

Parent losing a child
This theme was used to some degree in the following episodes:
 "The Ferguson Syndrome", wherein the Fergusons lose their son Tommy after he saved Paul's life
 "The Patient", wherein Dr. Bauer loses his daughter Raina to Sakovsky's syndrome
 "Little Miss Lost", wherein Rosanna Wye has to confront her missing, deceased child after 60 years
 "The Bone Scatterer", wherein Travis Prescott's miscarried brother Jimmy acts as his guardian angel
 "Mother's Daughter", wherein the Cotrells are forced to give up their daughter Hannah and stop Lucinda Morgan Bryant from committing suicide
 "The Ghost", wherein Larry Kittredge is haunted by the poltergeist of his deceased son
 "The Letter", wherein Georgia Wilson receives letters from her dead father, ghostwritten through a death row inmate
 "Paul is Dead", wherein Paul loses Evelyn's son Matty at a playground

Other themes
Richard Hatem addressed the theme of the episodes "The Ghost" and "The Letter", which were both "conceived" around the same time. Both episodes explored the idea of living people making contact with the spirit of someone who used to be a part of their lives, but who was now deceased. In "The Ghost", Larry Kittredge believes his dead son Kevin is haunting the realty office where he works; in "The Letter", Georgia Wilson begins receiving letters from her dead father, written through his murderer, death row inmate Edward Dubek. In both episodes, the conclusion both characters reached was it was best to save a "terrestrial relationship" (Larry Kittredge's relationship with his wife and Georgia Wilson's relationships with Paul and Poppi) rather than continue to explore a "possibly unreal spiritual relationship".

Richard Hatem lists "Saint Debbie" amongst his favorite episodes, partly because of its theme, and claims to be one of the few people who like the episode. Hatem says that "Saint Debbie" is the only episode to include "no real psychic phenomena", but is rather the story of an "everyday miracle".

Post-cancellation
Had the show been an "enormous success", Richard Hatem says a "modest plan was in place of where the show would have gone". The series would have continued the mythology of Paul's destiny: whether or not Paul was destined for good or evil, and the amount of control he had over his own destiny. Ideas included more close-ended stories and further exploring the backstories of Alva Keel and Evelyn Santos, as well as some ideas for unproduced episodes which were "very much in vein of the thirteen [produced episodes]"; however, the producers never saw much further than that.

In 2022, TVLine include Miracles on their list of the best one-season shows.

Episodes

Broadcast history
Debuting the night after ABC's broadcast of Super Bowl XXXVII, Miracles premiered on January 27, 2003 at 10:00pm as part of the network's new "Super Monday" line-up. Despite heavy promotion of the new lineup, which also featured the new series Veritas: The Quest and a new night for hit drama The Practice, ABC finished in fourth place in the ratings that night, with the premiere of Miracles being seen by 8.74 million viewers in the United States and scoring a 3.6 rating/9 share in the advertiser-coveted adults 18–49 demographic, ABC's highest rating in the timeslot since March 2001.

Despite generally positive reviews from critics and a small loyal following, Miracles failed in the ratings, and the mismanagement of the show's timeslot was largely blamed. After three episodes aired, the series was pre-empted for several weeks, "for several different reasons", according to series creator Richard Hatem. All three Monday night dramas were pulled for the remainder of the February 2003 sweeps period after scoring season low ratings on February 10. The Miracles timeslot was filled on February 17 by a rebroadcast of the Granada Television documentary special Living with Michael Jackson, and on February 24 by a rebroadcast of the season finale of The Bachelorette.

Two more episodes aired in early March 2003 when ABC preempted their Monday lineup for another two weeks, despite promoting that The Practice and Miracles would air six straight weeks of original episodes beginning March 3; ABC's March 17 primetime lineup was devoted entirely to news coverage about the impending War in Iraq, while a second new episode of The Practice aired in the 10:00pm hour on March 24. The final broadcast episode, "Hand of God", aired on March 31, 2003, drawing five million viewers and a 1.8 rating/5 share in adults 18–49.

ABC officially cancelled the series on April 3, 2003, filling the Monday 10:00pm timeslot with reruns of The Practice for the remainder of the season. The Miracles message boards on ABC's official website were closed 24 hours later. The show placed 105th in the Nielsen ratings during its six episode run, averaging 6.53 million viewers and a 2.5 rating/6 share in adults 18–49.

The remaining seven episodes produced were never aired in the United States. Canada's VisionTV began airing the show on October 3, 2003 and aired all 13 episodes, marking the first time the latter seven episodes were broadcast on television. VisionTV later aired the entire series again on Monday nights from January through March 2004 and 2005.

About the show's failure, Skeet Ulrich said: "the frustrating part is that it did take off. It did really well. We were the show that aired after the Super Bowl [sic], and we had over 10 million viewers [sic]. And then Bush started bombing Iraq, and we were pre-empted for war coverage. And then because we lost the momentum, they shifted the day of the week it aired [sic] and didn’t tell people. It was an odd combination of why it didn’t last. But it did take off. It had a massive following and was doing well, and the stories were good. So it wasn’t anything we did or that the fans did. It wasn’t failing. It was just the timing of everything at that moment killed it. And it’s unfortunate, because I think it had a lot of story left in it— much like Jericho —but then between Desert Storm and the way networks do things, it just went away."

U.S. television ratings

DVD release
Shout! Factory released the entire series on DVD in Region 1 on April 19, 2005. The 4-disc set features six commentary tracks, five deleted scenes, a 30-minute interview with series creator Richard Hatem, and a rough cut of a series promo.

Awards and nominations

See also
 Vatican Miracle Examiner – a Japanese light-novel, manga and anime with similar elements.
 Apparitions – a British TV series about a Vatican miracle investigator.

References

External links
 

 
2000s American science fiction television series
2000s American drama television series
2003 American television series debuts
2003 American television series endings
American Broadcasting Company original programming
Religious drama television series
Television shows filmed in Vancouver
Television series by ABC Studios
Works by Michael Petroni